The Baker Stock Company was a theater group based in Portland, Oregon, United States, active from 1901 through 1923. The company was established by businessman George Luis Baker, who served as its manager from 1901 to 1915.

History

The Baker Stock Company was founded by businessman George Luis Baker in 1901. Its anchor theater, the Baker Theatre, opened in 1902. This location, later known as the Playhouse Theatre, among other names, became a vaudeville house and eventually a cinema; the Baker Stock Company anchor theatre relocated several times during its existence.

Historian Gordon B. Dodds notes that the Baker Stock Company was "among the best in the nation" of its kind, and produced theatrical productions for several weeks of each year. Dodds further notes: 

Among the company's notable actors included local child performers Mayo Methot and Rhea Mitchell; Josephine Dillon; Herbert Heyes, and John Gilbert, who performed with the company as a guitarist.

After the company's dissolution in 1923, it was announced by George Baker in the spring of 1926 that a merger was planned with the Forrest Taylor Stock Company, as well as the erecting of a new theater on Portland's west side for an estimated $400,000. With this new facility, the company planned to provide theatrical productions throughout the year. The merger, however, never came to fruition.

Notable players

References

1901 establishments in Oregon
20th century in Portland, Oregon
Theatre companies in Oregon